The 2009-10 season will be Debreceni VSC - TEVA's 17th competitive season, 17th consecutive season in the Soproni Liga and 107th year in existence as a football club.

Team kit
The team kits for the 2009-10 season are produced by Adidas and the shirt sponsor is TEVA. The home kit is red colour and the away kit is white colour.

Squad

First-team squad

Updated 9 August 2009.

Reserve Squad

Transfers

Summer

In:

Out:

Winter

Loaned out

Overall
This section displays the club's financial expenditure's in the transfer market. Because all transfer fee's are not disclosed to the public, the numbers displayed in this section are only based on figures released by media outlets.

Spending
Summer:   £623,000

Winter:   £0

Total:    £623,000

Income
Summer:   £667,500

Winter:   £0

Total:   £667,500

Expenditure
Summer:  £44,500

Winter:  £0

Total:  £44,500

Statistics

Appearances and goals
Last updated on 1 May 2010.

|}

Top scorers
Includes all competitive matches. The list is sorted by shirt number when total goals are equal.

Last updated on 3 December 2009

Disciplinary record
Includes all competitive matches. Players with 1 card or more included only.

Last updated on 3 December 2009

Overall
{|class="wikitable"
|-
|Games played || 30 (14 Soproni Liga, 12 UEFA Champions League, 3 Hungarian Cup and 0 Hungarian League Cup)
|-
|Games won || 18  (10 Soproni Liga, 5 UEFA Champions League, 3 Hungarian Cup and 0 Hungarian League Cup)
|-
|Games drawn ||  1  (1 Soproni Liga, 0 UEFA Champions League, 0 Hungarian Cup and 0 Hungarian League Cup)
|-
|Games lost ||  11  (4 Soproni Liga, 7 UEFA Champions League, 0 Hungarian Cup and 0 Hungarian League Cup)
|-
|Goals scored || 59
|-
|Goals conceded || 49
|-
|Goal difference || +10
|-
|Yellow cards || 53
|-
|Red cards || 4
|-
|rowspan="1"|Worst discipline ||   Leandro de Almeida (7 , 0 )
|-
|rowspan="1"|Best result || 8-2 (A) v Nyírmadai ISE - Hungarian Cup - 2009.10.07
|-
|rowspan="2"|Worst result || 0–4 (H) v Olympique Lyonnais - UEFA Champions League - 2009.09.29
|-
|4–0 (A) v Olympique Lyonnais - UEFA Champions League - 2009.12.09
|-
|rowspan="2"|Most appearances ||  Péter Czvitkovics (26 appearances)
|-
|  Adamo Coulibaly (26 appearances)
|-
|rowspan="1"|Top scorer ||   Adamo Coulibaly (13 goals)
|-
|Points || 55/90 (60.44%)
|-

Club

Coaching staff
{|class="wikitable"
!Position
!Staff
|-
|Manager|| András Herczeg
|-
|rowspan="2"|Assistant managers|| Zoran Spisljak
|-
| Zsolt Bücs
|-
|First team fitness coach|| Mihály Dankó
|-
|Goalkeeping coach|| József Mező
|-
|Head scout|| Norbert Csarnai
|-
|rowspan="2"|Club doctor|| Dr. Zoltán Dézsi
|-
| Dr. Lehel Varga
|-
|Masseur|| István Nagy
|-
|Reserve team manager|| Elemér Kondás
|-
|Youth team manager|| László Sáfár
|-
|Academy manager|| István Antal

Other information

Soproni Liga

Classification

Results summary

Results by round

Matches

Diósgyőri VTK: Köteles - B. Lakatos, Milicic, Kállai, G. Horváth - Lipusz, P. Takács, Lippai, Gohér (Viskovic 87.) - Balajti (Bokros 67.), Búrány. Coach: Zoltán Aczél.
Debreceni VSC: Pantic - Z. Nagy, Komlósi, M. Fodor, Mohl - Czvitkovics, A. Katona, Czanik, Rezes (Vinícius 46.) - Coulibaly (Dombi 65.), Dudu (P. Szilágyi 58.). Coach: András Herczeg.
G.: Lippai (93. - pen.)
Y.: G. Horváth (78.), Lippai (81.), Gohér (94.) – Mohl (70.)
R.: P. Szilágyi (92.)

Debreceni VSC: Pantic - Z. Nagy, I. Szűcs, M. Fodor, Korhut - Huszák (Dombi 46.), J. Varga, Leandro, Rezes (Vinícius 73.) - L. Oláh, Dudu (Coulibaly 46.). Coach: András Herczeg.
Lombard-Pápa TFC: L. Szűcs - T. Sipos (A. Császár 61.), G. Tóth, Dlusztus, Venczel - G. Varga, Gyömbér, N. Heffler (Sarus 46.), Bárányos - Bali, Béres (Zs. Szabó 46.). Coach: György Véber.
G.: L. Oláh (48.), Coulibaly (58.)
Y.: Korhut (82.), M. Fodor (85.) – Dlusztus (30.), Gyömbér (89.)

Budapest Honvéd FC: G. Németh - Á. Takács (Bojtor 82.), Vukmir, Benjamin, Hajdú - Moreira, A. Horváth, Hrepka (Abraham 57.), Diego - Zsolnai (Palásthy 71.), Abass. Coach: Massimo Morales.
Debreceni VSC: Pantic - Bernáth, Komlósi, N. Mészáros, Fodor - Vinicius (Czvitkovics 46.), A. Katona, J. Varga (Dombi 66.), Leandro - Rudolf, Dudu (Coulibaly 46.). Coach: András Herczeg.
G.: Abraham (68.) – Leandro (76.), Rudolf (90.+1)
Y.: Vukmir (60.), Benjamin (77.), Palásthy (83.) – Dudu (42.), Leandro (67.), Benáth (70.), Czvitkovics (84.)

Debreceni VSC: Poleksic - Bodnár, P. Máté, N. Mészáros, Leandro - Czvitkovics, Z. Kiss, Ramos (Dombi 46.), P. Szakály - L. Oláh (Coulibaly 64.), Rudolf (Katona 81.). Coach: András Herczeg.
Szombathelyi Haladás: Rózsa - Schimmer, Guzmics, Kuttor, P. Tóth - Rajos, B. Molnár, Csontos - Skriba (Rácz 60.), Oross (Ugrai 65.), G. Nagy (A. Simon 75.). Coach: Aurél Csertői.
G.: Leandro (2.), Czvitkovics (63.) – Ugrai (75.)
Y.: Leandro (89.) – G. Nagy (21.), Skriba (59.), P. Tóth (90.)

Debreceni VSC: Poleksic - Bernáth, Komlósi, N. Mészáros, Fodor - Czvitkovics, Ramos, J. Varga (Z. Kiss 40.), P. Szakály (A. Katona 85.) - L. Oláh (Dombi 74.), Coulibaly. Coach: András Herczeg.
Zalaegerszegi TE: Vlaszák - Kocsárdi, Miljatovic, Todorovic, P. Máté - Sluka (G. Kovács 80.), A. Horváth (Illés 68.), Kamber, Magasföldi - Zs. Balázs (D. Pavicevic 34.), Rudnevs. Coach: János Csank.
G.: J. Varga (4.), L. Oláh (9.), P. Szakály (17.), Komlósi (25.), Coulibaly (42.) – Zs. Balázs (19.), Rudnevs (22.), Todorovic (30. - pen.)
Y.: Fodor (22.), Ramos (28.) – Todorovic (45.), Magasföldi (82.)

Debreceni VSC: Poleksic - Bernáth, Komlósi (Fodor 43.), N. Mészáros, Leandro - Czvitkovics, Z. Kiss, J. Varga, P. Szakály (Dombi 61.) - Rudolf, Coulibaly (L. Oláh 75.). Coach: András Herczeg.
Nyíregyháza Spartacus: Vojinovic - I. Lakatos, Mboussi, Goia, Z. Kiss - Müller. Ambrusz (Minczér 56.), Miskolczi (Czanik 46.), Homma - Bogdanovic, Dosso (Batizi-Pócsi 69.). Coach: Lázár Szentes.
G.: Rudolf (7., 49.), Coulibaly (22.) – Homma (56.)
Y.: Bernáth (66.) – Mboussi (56.)

Paksi SE: Csernyánszki - L. Horváth, J. Szabó, Éger, Nikolov - Böde (Bohner 75.), Lisztes, Zováth, T. Heffler (Urbán 55.) - T. Kiss (Báló 69.), Tököli. Coach: Imre Gellei.
Debreceni VSC: Pantic (Poleksic 6.) - Bernáth, N. Mészáros, Fodor, Leandro - Czvitkovics, Z. Kiss, J. Varga, P. Szakály (Laczkó 69.) - L. Oláh (Ramos 85.), Coulibaly. Coach: András Herczeg.
G.: P. Szakály (33.)
Y.: J. Szabó (69.), Éger (85.) – L. Oláh (71.)

Debreceni VSC: Poleksic - Bernáth, Komlósi, I. Szűcs, Laczkó (Dombi 71.) - Czvitkovics, J. Varga, Leandro, P. Szakály - L. Oláh (Vinicius 59.), Feczesin (Coulibaly 13.). Coach: András Herczeg.
Ferencvárosi TC: Megyeri - Joaquin (Shaw 86.), Z. Balog, R. Wolfe, Alcantara - Rósa, Morrison, P. Lipcsei (Fitos 77.), Ashmore (Pisanjuk 73.), B. Tóth - Ferenczi. Coach: Robert Davison.
G.: P. Szakály (51.), Coulibaly (72.) – Ferenczi (20.)
Y.: Komlósi (60.) – Ferenczi (44.), Ashmore (60.), Morrison (66.), Pisanjuk (86.)
R.: Megyeri (91.)

Kaposvári Rákóczi FC: Milinte - Junior, Zahorecz, Stanic, Petrók - Bank (D. Hegedűs 42.), Gujic (B. Benjamin 55.), Maróti, Pest (Kovácsevics 68.) - Reszli, Nikolic. Coach: László Prukner.
Debreceni VSC: Poleksic - Bernáth, N. Mészáros (I. Szűcs 31.), Fodor, Leandro - Czvitkovics, Z. Kiss, J. Varga, P. Szakály (Rezes 70.) - L. Oláh (Coulibaly 46.), Laczkó. Coach: András Herczeg.
G.: Bank (17.), Nikolic (61.), Zahorecz (64. - pen.), Reszli (86.) – Czvitkovics (47., 54. - pen.), P. Szakály (70.), Rezes (81.)
Y.: Zahorecz (49.), Petrók (53.), Pest (62.) – I. Szűcs (63.)

Debreceni VSC: Pantic - Szélesi, Mijadinoski, N. Mészáros, Laczkó - P. Szakály (Leandro 72.), Ramos (Z. Kiss 89.), J. Varga, Czvitkovics - L. Oláh (Dombi 62.), Coulibaly. Coach: András Herczeg.
MTK Budapest FC: Szántai - Vági (A. Pál 60.), Á. Pintér, B. Balogh, Hidvégi - Rodenbücher, Pátkai, Zsidai - Gosztonyi (Könyves 84.), Lencse, Szatmári. Coach: József Garami.
G.: Coulibaly (34. - pen.), P. Szakály (36.)
Y.: Szélesi (56.) – Zsidai (18.), Hidvégi (33.), Pátkai (85.)
R.: Lencse (85.)

Vasas SC: Végh - Zs. Balog, G. Kovács, Mrdjanin, B. Tóth (A. Marton 81.) - Remili (Kincses 70.), Sz. Bakos, Dobric, Piller - Lázok, Divic (Imrik 65.). Coach: Géza Mészöly.
Debreceni VSC: Pantic - Szélesi, Komlósi, Fodor, Leandro - P. Szakály (Ramos 69.), Z. Kiss, Czvitkovics, Laczkó (Dombi 77.) - Coulibaly, Dudu (Bernáth 17.). Coach: András Herczeg.
G.: Dobric (10., 69.) – Coulibaly (26., 91.), Z. Kiss (53.), Leandro (86.)
Y.: B. Tóth (24.), G. Kovács (80.) – Z. Kiss (23.), Leandro (61.)
R.: Mrdjanin (85.) – Komlósi (14.)

Videoton FC Fehérvár: Zs. Sebők - Andic, Lipták, G. Horváth, R. Varga - Á. Elek, B. I Farkas, D. Szakály (Polonkai 65.) - D. Nagy, Sitku, Alves. Coach: György Mezey.
Debreceni VSC: Poleksic - Bodnár, Szélesi, Fodor, Leandro - Czvitkovics, Z. Kiss (Dombi 70.), J. Varga, P. Szakály (Laczkó 58.) - Rudolf, Coulibaly (Rezes 67.). Coach: András Herczeg.
G.: Lipták (47.), Polonkai (76.), Andic (84.)
Y.: Czvitkovics (75.)
R.: Czvitkovics (78.)

Debreceni VSC: Pantic - Bodnár, Komlósi, Szélesi, Fodor (Laczkó 77.) - Dombi (P. Szakály 59.), Z. Kiss (Ramos 46.), J. Varga, Leandro - Rudolf, Coulibaly. Coach: András Herczeg.
Újpest FC: Balajcza - Vermes, Vaskó, Z. Takács, Pollák - Simek, Korcsmár, Gy. Sándor, N. Tóth (Jucemar 87.) - Rajczi, Kabát. Coach: William John McStay.
G.: Rudolf (17. - pen.) – Kabát (40. - pen., 91. - pen.)
Y.: Pantic (38.), Rudolf (58.), Komlósi (90.) – Z. Takács (16.), Pollák (26.), Rajczi (27.), Korcsmár (62.), Vermes (69.)

Győri ETO FC: Stevanovic - Babic, Stanisic, Z. Fehér, O. Szabó - M. Kiss (Nicorec 78.), Pilibaitis, Józsi, Tokody - Aleksidze (Brnovic 82.), Kink (Dinjar 46.). Coach: Attila Pintér.
Debreceni VSC: Poleksic - Bodnár (Dudu 56.), Komlósi, Szélesi, Leandro - Czvitkovics, Z. Kiss, J. Varga (Laczkó 78.), P. Szakály (Dombi 65.) - Rudolf, Coulibaly. Coach: András Herczeg.
G.: Pilibaitis (1.)
Y.: Stanisic (66.), Aleksidze (75.), Z. Fehér (85.), Stevanovic (89.) – Bodnár (12.), Coulibaly (78.), Rudolf (85.)
R.: Babic (46.)

Debreceni VSC: Poleksic - Bodnár, Mijadinoski, Szélesi, Laczkó - P. Szakály, Z. Kiss, Ramos (Leandro 76.), Czvitkovics - L. Oláh (Dombi 81.), Coulibaly (Rudolf 66.). Coach: András Herczeg.
Kecskeméti TE - Ereco: Lazareanu - Schindler, Némedi, Gyagya, I. Farkas - Csordás (Tölgyesi 82.), Alempijevic, Litsingi, Koncz (Bagi 76.), Yannick - Montvai (Bertus 58.). Coach: László Czéh.
G.: Czvitkovics (27.)
Y.: Ramos (23.)

Debreceni VSC: Poleksic - Bodnár (Dombi 46.; Szakály 50.), Mészáros, Mijadinoski, Laczkó - Czvitkovics, Ramos, Varga, Yannick - Rudolf, Coulibaly (Feczesin 61.). Coach: András Herczeg.
Diósgyőri VTK: Malinauskas - Bognár, Gal, Supic, Zámbó - Dobos (George 57.), Vukadinovic, Lippai, Roszel (Haman 72.) - Bajzát, Brnovic (Somorjai 78.). Coach: Barnabás Tornyi.
G.: Laczkó (80.), Rudolf (82.), Mijadinoski (90.) – Bognár (43.)
Y.: Ramos (74.) – Dobos (23.), Vukadinovic (46.), Bognár (52.), George (73.), Haman (89.)

Lombard-Pápa TFC: L. Szűcs - G. Tóth, Dlusztus, A. Farkas, Rajnay - Quintero (Abwo 46.), Gyömbér (Jovánczai 75.), N. Heffler - Rebryk, Bárányos, Bali (Orosz 80.). Coach: György Véber.
Debreceni VSC: Poleksic - Bernáth (Szélesi 33.), N. Mészáros, Mijadinoski, Laczkó - Czvitkovics, Z. Kiss, Ramos (J. Varga 57.), P. Szakály - Rudolf, Feczesin (Coulibaly 76.). Coach: András Herczeg.
G.: A. Farkas (11. - pen.) – Rudolf (18.), G. Tóth (22. - o.g.), Mijadinoski (40.), P. Szakály (45.), Czvitkovics (90.+2)
Y.: Mijadinoski (11.), Ramos (54.), Laczkó (80.)

Debreceni VSC: Poleksic - Szélesi (Yannick 46.), N. Mészáros, Mijadinoski, Laczkó - P. Szakály (Coulibaly 60.), Ramos, J. Varga, Czvitkovics - Rudolf, Feczesin (Dombi 69.). Coach: András Herczeg.
Budapest Honvéd FC: G. Németh - Á. Takács, Botis (Palásthy 88.), Yanchuk (Bajner 80.), Vukmir - Abass, Coira, Moreira (Cuerda 60.), Macko, Diego - Abraham. Coach: Massimo Morales.
G.: Feczesin (2.), Coulibaly (72.) – Abraham (24.)
Y.: Laczkó (68.), Coulibaly (72.) – Cuerda (79.)

Szombathelyi Haladás: Rózsa - Schimmer, Guzmics, D. Lengyel, P. Tóth - G. Nagy (A. Simon 78.), Á. Simon, B. Molnár (Iszlai 18.), Halmosi - Bogdanovic (Sipos 78.), Oross. Coach: Antal Róth.
Debreceni VSC: Poleksic - Bodnár, N. Mészáros, Mijadinoski, Laczkó - P. Szakály (Yannick 65.), J. Varga, Ramos, Czvitkovics - Rudolf (Z. Kiss 81.), Coulibaly (Feczesin 52.). Coach: András Herczeg.
G.: Czvitkovics (68.), Feczesin (75.)
Y.: Halmosi (37.) – Rudolf (47.)

Zalaegerszegi TE: Vlaszák - Kocsárdi, Bogunovic, Miljatovic, Panikvar (Todorovic 60.) - Sluka, Kamber, Máté, Illés (Szalai 80.) - Pavicevic, Magasföldi (Balázs 55.). Coach: János Csank.
Debreceni VSC: Poleksic - Bodnár, Mészáros, Mijadinoski, Laczkó (Vinicius 78.) - Szakály (Yannick 55.), Ramos (Coulibaly 29.), Varga, Czvitkovics - Rudolf, Feczesin. Coach: András Herczeg.
G.: Sluka (12.), Pavicevic (33.), Illés (57.), Szalai (81.) – Coulibaly (68.)
Y.: Panikvar (49.) – Ramos (6.), Mészáros (25.), Mijadinoski (64.)

Nyíregyháza Spartacus: Ovsiyenko - Hurt, Struhár, Stanisic, Bosnjak - Miskolczi, Minczér, Davidov (Zabos 72.), Varga (Homma 46.) - Andorka, Fekete (Bouguerra 46.). Coach: Lázár Szentes.
Debreceni VSC: Verpecz - Bernáth, Mészáros, Mijadinoski, Laczkó - Czvitkovics, Szakály (Szélesi 61.), Ramos, Yannick (Rezes 72.) - Feczesin (Vinicius 80.), Coulibaly. Coach: András Herczeg.
G.: Mijadinoski (41.), Feczesin (55.), Coulibaly (57.)
Y.: Ramos (73.)

Debreceni VSC: Poleksic - Bernáth, Komlósi, Fodor, Korhut - Rezes, Kiss, Varga (Feczesin 46.), Czvitkovics - Coulibaly, Yannick (Dombi 46.; Szakály 74.). Coach: András Herczeg.
Paksi SE: Kovács - Vári, Éger, Szabó, Völgyi - Barta (Heffler 53.), Böde, Fiola, Nagy (Horváth 80.) - Sipeki (Tóth 62.), Tököli. Coach: Imre Gellei.
G.: Coulibaly (49., 80.), Feczesin (64. - pen.) – Böde (36.)
Y.: Kiss (25.), Czvitkovics (55.) – Vári (14.), Fiola (42.), Éger (63.), Böde (70.)

Ferencvárosi TC: Megyeri - Csizmadia, Dragóner, Tutoric, Stockley - Kulcsár (Wolfe 65.), Doherty, Adnan (Schembri 55.), Tóth (Lipcsei 83.) - Elding, Ferenczi. Coach: Craig Short.
Debreceni VSC: Poleksic - Bodnár, Mészáros, Mijadinoski, Szélesi - Czvitkovics, Spitzmüller (Yannick 46.), Kiss (Szakály 77.), Laczkó - Feczesin, Coulibaly. Coach: András Herczeg.
G.: Tóth (69.)
Y.: Elding (11.), Csizmadia (20.), Dragóner (32.), Tóth (71.) – Szélesi (12.), Laczkó (52.), Feczesin (74.)

Debreceni VSC: Verpecz - Bodnár, Mészáros, Komlósi, Szélesi - Czvitkovics, Varga (Rudolf 42.), Laczkó - Feczesin (Szakály 77.), Coulibaly, Yannick (Rezes 72.). Coach: András Herczeg.
Kaposvári Rákóczi FC: Milinte - Grúz, Petrók, Zahorecz, Junior - Maróti (Culum 84.), Pest (Antanasijevic 82.), Stanic, Balázs - Godslove (Kulcsár 70.), Oláh. Coach: László Prukner.
G.: Czvitkovics (53.), Feczesin (57.), Rudolf (60.), Mészáros (64.), Coulibaly (66. - pen.) – Maróti (50.)
Y.: Komlósi (40.) – Godslove (31.), Grúz (52.), Petrók (66.), Kulcsár (83.)

MTK Budapest FC: Filipovic - Rodenbücher, Pintér, Szekeres, Hidvégi - Kulcsár, Zsidai (Nikházi 83.), Szatmári, Szabó (Pátkai 64.), A. Pál - Lázok. Coach: József Garami.
Debreceni VSC: Verpecz - Bodnár, Mészáros, Mijadinoski, Laczkó - Czvitkovics (Ramos 78), Szélesi, Szakály (Szilágyi 46.), Yannick (Rezes 46.) - Coulibaly, Feczesin. Coach: András Herczeg.
G.: Lázok (21.), Szatmári (40.) – Feczesin (64., 71.), Czvitkovics (76.)
Y.: Szélesi (56.)

Hungarian Cup

Round of 32

Nyírmadai ISE: Tuza - Mátyus, Benkő, Fejes, Dankó - Gy. Katona, Bancsi, Botos (Járomcsák 66.), A. Németh (Istrate 66.) - Kirner, Petran (Szőke 90.). Coach: Bertalan Szilágyi.
Debreceni VSC: Pantic - Bernáth (Szélesi 62.), Mijadinoski, Komlósi, Leandro - Czvitkovics, Z. Kiss (Dombi 56.), Ramos, P. Szakály (Laczkó 46.) - Dudu, Coulibaly. Coach: András Herczeg.
G.: Járomcsák (73.), Mátyus (81.) – Dudu (2., 55., 84., 85.), Coulibaly (19. - pen., 65., 66.), Mijadinoski (57.)
Y.: Mijadinoski (28.)

Round of 16

First leg

Mezőkövesd-Zsóry SE: Tajti - P. Nagy, Toplenszki, Pelicic, Sivák - Bene, Kaszás, Cukic, Ragó (P. Kovács 57.) - Z. Varga (Elek 80.), Binder (Bogdány 50.). Coach: Géza Huszák.
Debreceni VSC: Pantic - Bernáth, I. Szűcs, Mijadinoski, Korhut - Vinicius, A. Katona, Ramos, Éles (Rezes 56.) - L. Oláh (Leonardo 76.), Dudu (Kerekes 57.). Coach: András Herczeg.
G.: Sivák (71.) – Vinicius (2. - pen., 90.), L. Oláh (6.), Mijadinoski (46.)
Y.: Toplenszki (1.) – Korhut (21.), Ramos (70.), Rezes (86.)
R.: P. Kovács (76.)

Second leg

Debreceni VSC: Verpecz - G. Oláh, Mijadinoski (Kardos 46.), Ludánszki, Korhut - Bódi, Spitzmüller, Leonardo (Dudu 57.), Éles - Kerekes (L. Oláh 74.), Rezes. Coach: András Herczeg.
Mezőkövesd-Zsóry SE: Ficsór - P. Nagy, Toplenszki, Pelicic, Sivák (T. Hegedűs 63.) - Surányi (Bene 58.), Tatár, Vitelki, Z. Varga (Ragó 48.) - Kasza, Bogdány. Coach: Géza Huszák.
G.: Rezes (41., 85.), Dudu (50., 82.) – Bogdány (35., 76.), Surányi (45.)
Y.: G. Oláh (69.) – Pelicic (23.), T. Hegedűs (90.)

Debreceni VSC 8–4 Mezőkövesd SE on aggregate.

Quarterfinals

First leg

Debreceni VSC: Pantic - Bernáth, Mészáros, Mijadinoski, Fodor - Czvitkovics, J. Varga, Ramos, Laczkó (P. Szakály 89.) - L. Oláh (Coulibaly 61.), Feczesin (Dombi 74.). Coach: András Herczeg.
MTK Budapest FC: Szántai - Vági, Rodenbücher, Á. Pintér, Hidvégi - Könyves (A. Pál 53.), Zsidai, Pátkai, Szatmári (Á. Szabó 20.; Melczer 68.) - Gosztonyi, Lencse. Coach: József Garami.
G.: Feczesin (45.), Czvitkovics (50.)
Y.: Laczkó (87.), J. Varga (92.) – Vági (48.), Á. Pintér (77.), Zsidai (84.)

Second leg

MTK Budapest FC: Szántai - Vági, Rodenbücher, Pintér, Hidvégi - Könyves (Melczer 117.), Zsidai, Á. Szabó (Nikházi 76.), Pátkai, Gosztonyi (A. Pál 46.) - Lencse. Coach: József Garami.
Debreceni VSC - TEVA: Verpecz - Bodnár, Szélesi, Mijadinoski, Laczkó - Szakály (Fodor 91.), Ramos, Varga, Czvitkovics - Coulibaly (L. Oláh 69.), Feczesin. Coach: András Herczeg
G.: A. Pál (77.), Zsidai (80.)
Y.: Pátkai (53.), Vági (64.), Zsidai (90.+2) – Ramos (82.)

MTK Budapest FC 2–2 Debreceni VSC on aggregate. Debreceni VSC won 5–4 on penalties.

Semifinal

First leg

Budapest Honvéd FC: I. Tóth - Á. Takács, Cuerda, Debreceni, Ianchuk - Abass, A. Horváth (Vukmir 65.), Coira (Moreira 78.), Hajdú - Bajner (Vólent 83.), Abraham. Coach: Massimo Morales.
Debreceni VSC: Pantic - Szélesi, Komlósi, Fodor, Korhut - Bódi (Vinicius 68.), Spitzmüller, Z. Kiss, Rezes - Coulibaly (Kardos 86.), Yannick (P. Szilágyi 56.). Coach: András Herczeg.
G.: Abraham (88.) – P. Szilágyi (81.)
Y.: A. Horváth (45.), Vukmir (66.) – Z. Kiss (80.)

Second leg

Debreceni VSC: Verpecz - Bodnár, Mijadinoski, Mészáros, Laczkó - Bódi (Czvitkovics 73.), Spitzmüller, Szélesi, Szakály (Coulibaly 60.) - Feczesin, Yannick (Fodor 87.). Coach: András Herczeg.
Budapest Honvéd FC: Németh - Tavars, Cuerda, Botis, Hajdú - Abass (Bajner 71.), Macko (Moreira 67.), Akassou, Diego - Palásthy (Coira 82.), Abraham. Coach: Massimo Morales.
G.: Yannick (34.), Laczkó (85.) – Abraham (83.)
Y.: Bodnár (58.), Mészáros (87.), Laczkó (90.) – Macko (39.), Palásthy (49.), Akassou (53.), Tavars (90.)

Debreceni VSC 3–2 Budapest Honvéd FC on aggregate.

Final

Debreceni VSC: Verpecz - Bernáth, Komlósi, Mijadinoski, Laczkó - Bódi (J. Varga 91.), Szélesi, Czvitkovics (Z. Kiss 81.), P. Szakály, Yannick (Rezes 44.) - Coulibaly. Coach: András Herczeg.
Zalaegerszegi TE: Vlaszák - Kocsárdi (Rajcomar 77.), Miljatovic, Bogunovic, P. Máté - Sluka (Zs. Balázs 61.), A. Horváth, Kamber, Illés - Rudnevs, Pavicevic. Coach: János Csank.
G.: Coulibaly (24., 68.), Yannick (31.) – Pavicevic (42.), Rudnevs (70.)
Y.: Komlósi (12.), Laczkó (32.), Rezes (71.) – P. Máté (64.), A. Horváth (71.)

UEFA Champions League

Qualifying round

Second qualifying round

First leg

Debreceni VSC: Poleksic - Bernáth, Mészáros, P. Máté, Leandro - Czvitkovics, J. Varga, Z. Kiss, P. Szakály (Dombi 84.) - Dudu (L. Oláh 58.), Rudolf (Katona 91.). Coach: András Herczeg.
Kalmar FF: Wasta - Nouri, Alander, Lantz, Larsson - Sobralense, R. Elm, Rydström, Eriksson, Mendes (Dauda 84.) - D. Elm (Santos 84.). Coach: Nanne Bergstrand.
G.: J. Varga (73.), Z. Kiss (86.)
Y.: Bernáth (65.), J. Varga (72.)

Second leg

Kalmar FF: Wasta - Nouri, Carlström (Johansson 57.), Lantz, Larsson - Sobralense (Smylie 69.), R. Elm, Rydström, Eriksson, Mendes - D. Elm (Santos 57.). Coach: Nanne Bergstrand.
Debreceni VSC: Poleksic - Bernáth, P. Máté, Mészáros, Leandro - Czvitkovics, Z. Kiss, J. Varga, P. Szakály (Dombi 74.) - L. Oláh (P. Szilágyi 74.), Rudolf (Komlósi 87.). Coach: András Herczeg.
G.: R. Elm (19., 71. - pen), Mendes (32.) – J. Varga (13.)
Y.: Rydström (46.), R. Elm (89.) – Z. Kiss (45.), J. Varga (60.), Leandro (72.), Dombi (79.)
R.: P. Máté (86.)
Kalmar 3–3 Debrecen on aggregate.  Debrecen won on away goals.

Third qualifying round

First leg

FC Levadia Tallinn: Kaalma - Sisov, Morozov, Kalimullin, Teniste - Malov (Leitan 79.), Ivanov, Nahk, S. Puri (E. Puri 89.) - Andreev, Gussev (Zelinski 86.). Coach: Igor Prins.
Debreceni VSC: Poleksic - Bernáth, Komlósi, N. Mészáros, Leandro - Czvitkovics, Z. Kiss, Katona (Dombi 67.), P. Szakály (I. Szűcs 84.) - Rudolf, P. Szilágyi (Coulibaly 57.). Coach: András Herczeg.
G.: Leandro (70.)
Y.: Nahk (43.), Malov (58.), Andreev (80.) – Leandro (32.), Coulibaly (72.)

Second leg

Debreceni VSC: Poleksic - Bernáth (Dombi 65.), Komlósi, N. Mészáros, Fodor - Czvitkovics, J. Varga, Z. Kiss, P. Szakály - Rudolf (I. Szűcs 89.), Coulibaly (L. Oláh 71.). Coach: András Herczeg.
FC Levadia Tallinn: Kaalma - Marmor (Sisov 21.), Morozov, Kalimullin, Teniste - S. Puri, Ivanov, Malov, Saarelma - Andreev (Zelinski 46.), Gussev.. Coach: Igor Prins.
G.: Coulibaly (70.)
Y.: J. Varga (22.), Rudolf (48.), Fodor (87.) – Malov (24.), Saarelma (31.)
R.: Malov (80.)
Debrecen won 2–0 on aggregate.

Play-Off

First leg

PFC Levski Sofia: Petkov - Minev, Topuzakov, Genev, Wagner - Soares, Sarmov, Bardon, Yovov (Joaozinho 71.) - Tasevski (Ortega 60.), Hristov (Krastovchev 85.). Coach: Ratko Dostanic.
Debreceni VSC: Poleksic - Bodnár, N. Mészáros, P. Máté (Komlósi 15.), Leandro - Czvitkovics (Ramos 79.), J. Varga, Z. Kiss, P. Szakály (Dombi 55.) - Rudolf, Coulibaly. Coach: András Herczeg.
G.: Bardon (51.) – Bodnár (12.), Czvitkovics (76.)
Y.: Petkov (82.) – Z. Kiss (82.)

Second leg

Debreceni VSC: Poleksic - Bodnár, Komlósi, Mészáros, Leandro - Czvitkovics (Fodor 81.), Varga, Ramos, Szakály (Dombi 58.) - Rudolf (Oláh 89.), Coulibaly. Coach: András Herczeg.
PFC Levski Sofia: Petkov - Benzoukane, Topuzakov, Rabeh, Minev - Zé Soares, Sarmov, Bardon, Joaozinho (Tasevski 60.) - Yovov (Dimitrov 71.), Hristov (Ortega 76.). Coach: Ratko Dostanic.
G.: Varga (13.), Rudolf (35.)
Y.: Leandro (21.), Ramos (37.), Varga (61.), Dombi (76.) – Sarmov (9.), Zé Soares (52.)
Debrecen won 4–1 on aggregate.

Group stage

Matches

Liverpool FC: Reina - Johnson, Skrtel, Carragher, Insua - Benayoun (Mascherano 87.), Lucas, Gerrard, Kuyt (Aurélio 90.+2), Riera (Babel 80.) - Torres. Coach: Rafael Benítez.
Debreceni VSC: Poleksic - Bodnár, Komlósi, Mészáros, Fodor - Czvitkovics, Kiss, Leandro, Ramos (Laczkó 67.), Szakály (Feczesin 79.) - Coulibaly. Coach: András Herczeg.
G.: Kuyt (45.+1)
Y.: Gerrard (26.) – Fodor (21.)

Debreceni VSC: Poleksic - Bodnár, Komlósi, Fodor, Leandro - Szakály (Dombi 85.), Varga, Kiss, Czvitkovics, Laczkó (Rudolf 46.) - Coulibaly. Coach: András Herczeg.
Olympique Lyon: Lloris - Réveillere, Cris, Toulalan, Cissokho (Kolodziejczak 78.) - Clerc, Makoun, Pjanic (Gonalons 57.), Källström - Govou, Gomis (Ederson 54.). Coach: Claude Puel.
G.: Källström (2.), Pjanic (13.), Govou (24.), Gomis (51.)
Y.: Gonalons (68.) – Szakály (58.)

Debreceni VSC: Poleksic - Bodnár, Komlósi, Mészáros (Szélesi 30.), Leandro - Czvitkovics, Varga, Kiss (Laczkó 87.), Szakály (Dombi 57.) - Rudolf Coulibaly. Coach: András Herczeg.
AC Fiorentina: Frey - Comotto, Gamberini, Dainelli (Natali 55.), Pasqual - Santana (Jörgensen 68.), Zanetti (Montolivo 46.), Donadel, Vargas - Mutu, Gilardino. Coach: Claudio Cesare Prandelli.
G.: Czvitkovics (2.), Rudolf (28.), Coulibaly (88.) – Mutu (6., 20.), Gilardino (10.), Santana (37.)
Y.: Rudolf (28.), Bodnár (81.) – Donadel (16.)

AC Fiorentina: Avramov - Comotto, Gamberini (Kröldrup 33.), Dainelli, Pasqual - Marchionni, Donadel, Zanetti (Montolivo 46.), Mutu, Vargas (Santana 77.) - Gilardino. Coach: Claudio Cesare Prandelli.
Debreceni VSC: Pantic - Bodnár, Komlósi (Kiss 10.), Szélesi, Fodor - Czvitkovics, Varga, Ramos (Coulibaly 52.), Leandro - Laczkó (Szakály 64.), Rudolf. Coach: András Herczeg.
G.: Mutu (14.), Dainelli (52.), Montolivo (59.), Marchionni (61.), Gilardino (74.) – Rudolf (38.), Coulibaly (70.)
Y.: Dainelli (28.) – Ramos (27.)

Debreceni VSC: Poleksic - Bodnár, Mészáros, Mijadinoski, Fodor (Dombi 78.) - Szakály (Coulibaly 62.), Szélesi, Kiss, Czvitkovics, Laczkó - Rudolf. Coach: András Herczeg.
Liverpool FC: Reina - Johnson, Carragher, Agger, Insua - Kuyt, Lucas, Gerrard (Aquilani 90.+1), Mascherano, Aurélio (Dossena 89.) - N'Gog (Benayoun 77.). Coach: Rafael Benítez.
G.: N'Gog (4.)
Y.: Szélesi (23.)

Olympique Lyon: Lloris - Réveillére, Cris, Boumsong, Cissokho - Govou (Pjanic 29.), Gonalons, Makoun (Källström 73.), Delgado, Bastos - Gomis (Lisandro 66.). Coach: Claude Puel.
Debreceni VSC: Pantic - Bodnár (Bernáth 52.), Mészáros, Mijadinoski, Laczkó - Czvitkovics, Szélesi, Ramos (Kiss 57.), Varga, Szakály (Feczesin 75.) - Coulibaly. Coach: András Herczeg.
G.: Gomis (25.), Bastos (45.), Pjanić (59.), Cissokho (76.)
Y.: Ramos (39.)

Hungarian Super Cup

Budapest Honvéd FC: G. Németh - Benjamin, Botis, N. Hajdú, Zsolnai (Moreira 67.), Hrepka, Debreceni, Abraham, Diego (Abass 85.), Hidi, Á. Takács. Coach: Tibor Sisa.
Debreceni VSC: Pantic - Mohl (I. Szűcs 52.), Dombi, Rezes, Komlósi, Vinícius (P. Szilágyi 59.), Fodor, Z. Nagy, Coulibaly, Czanik (Spitzmüller 89.), Katona. Coach: András Herczeg.
G.: P. Szilágyi (83.)
Y.: Diego (20.) – Mohl (15.), Z. Nagy (21.), Komlósi (72.), Spitzmüller (92.)
R.: Benjamin (75.)

References

External links
 Eufo
 DVSC 
 UEFA
 fixtures and results
 Debreceni VSC

2009-10
Hungarian football clubs 2009–10 season